Heptadecane is an organic compound, an alkane hydrocarbon with the chemical formula C17H36. The name may refer to any of 24894 theoretically possible structural isomers, or to a mixture thereof.

The unbranched isomer is normal or n-heptadecane,  CH3(CH2)15CH3.  In the IUPAC nomenclature, the name of this compound is simply heptadecane, since the other isomers are viewed and named as alkyl-substituted versions of smaller alkanes.

The most compact and branched isomer would be tetra-tert-butylmethane, but its existence is believed to be impossible due to steric hindrance. Indeed, it is believed to be the smallest "impossible" alkane.

References

External links
 List of plant species containing heptadecane, Dr. Duke's Phytochemical and Ethnobotanical Databases
 The smallest alkanes which cannot be made, the goodman group, university of cambridge

Alkanes